A crocket is a hook-shaped decorative element common in Gothic architecture.

Crocket may also refer to:
 Chibodee Crocket, a fictional character in the television series Mobile Fighter G Gundam
 James Crocket Wilson (1841–1899), Canadian businessman and politician

People with the surname Crocket
 Henry Crocket (1870–1926), English painter
 Oswald Smith Crocket (1868–1945), Canadian lawyer

See also
 Crockett (disambiguation)
 Croquet